Noel O'Dwyer (born 26 December 1948) is an Irish former hurler. At club level he played with Borris–Ileigh and was also a member of the Tipperary senior hurling team.

Career

O'Dwyer played hurling as a schoolboy at Templemore CBS where he won a Dr. Kinane Cup and three successive Dr. Croke Cup titles. He first played for Borris–Ileigh at juvenile and underage levels and was part of the team that won the club's inaugural Tipperary U21AHC title in 1969. O'Dwyer spent over 20 years with the club's senior team and won six North Tipperary SHC titles and three Tipperary SHC titles between 1972 and 1988. He was at centre-forward on the Borris–Ileigh team that beat Rathnure in the 1987 All-Ireland club final.

O'Dwyer first played for Tipperary at minor level in 1966. He won an All-Ireland U21HC medal in the first of his three consecutive seasons with the under-21 team in 1967. O'Dwyer was drafted onto the senior team in 1968 and was at centre-forward when the team beat Kilkenny by 5-17 to 5-14 in the 1971 All-Ireland final. Much of his senior career coincided with a barren spell for Tipperary, however, he won a National League title in 1979. O'Dwyer also won two Railway Cup medals with Munster. In retirement from playing he served as a senior team selector under Babs Keating.

Honours

Player

Borris–Ileigh
All-Ireland Senior Club Hurling Championship: 1987
Munster Senior Club Hurling Championship: 1986
Tipperary Senior Hurling Championship: 1981, 1983, 1986
North Tipperary Senior Hurling Championship: 1972, 1973, 1976, 1981, 1983, 1988
Tipperary Under-21 A Hurling Championship: 1969

Tipperary
All-Ireland Senior Hurling Championship: 1971
Munster Senior Hurling Championship: 1969, 1971
National Hurling League: 1978-79
All-Ireland Under-21 Hurling Championship: 1967
Munster Under-21 Hurling Championship: 1967

Munster
Railway Cup: 1970, 1976

Management

Tipperary
National Hurling League: 1993-94

References

External link

 Noel O'Dwyer player profile

1948 births
Living people
Borris-Ileigh hurlers
Tipperary inter-county hurlers
Munster inter-provincial hurlers
Hurling selectors
All-Ireland Senior Hurling Championship winners